Michiel van Lambalgen (born 6 November 1954, Krimpen aan den IJssel) is a professor of Logic and Cognitive Science at the Institute for Logic, Language and Computation and the Department of Philosophy, University of Amsterdam in the Netherlands.

In the 1980s van Lambalgen did research in randomness, but after some time felt the subject was "too abstract".  Then in the 1990s he moved to artificial intelligence, where he picked up the methodology for studying cognition.   In 1999 he spent a sabbatical with Keith Stenning at the University of Edinburgh where he learned about the psychology of reasoning.  His research interests include philosophy and the foundations of mathematics, reasoning with uncertainty, the psychology of reasoning, and the cognitive semantics of natural language.

Notes

External links
Michael van Lambalgen's web page
Prof. dr. M. van Lambalgen, 1954 - at the University of Amsterdam Album Academicum website

1954 births
Living people
Dutch logicians
Dutch cognitive scientists
20th-century Dutch philosophers
University of Amsterdam alumni
Academic staff of the University of Amsterdam
People from Krimpen aan den IJssel